The Association for Slavic, East European, and Eurasian Studies (ASEEES) is a scholarly society dedicated to the advancement of knowledge about the former Soviet Union (including Eurasia) and Eastern and Central Europe. The ASEEES supports teaching, research, and publication relating to the peoples and territories within this area.

Dedicated to the advancement of Slavic studies, ASEEES has cultivated the field's intellectual landscape for over fifty years through its chief publication, Slavic Review, its Annual Convention, its book prizes, and its organizational newsletter. Slavic Review is the leading scholarly journal in the field, with c.3,800 subscribers around the world. It features articles that can take any disciplinary approach, and are deemed to be original and significant to the field by peer-reviewers. The journal also features reviews and critiques of recent research within the field.

In addition to providing access to current research and scholarship in Slavic studies through Slavic Review, ASEEES has also held an Annual Convention for decades. These conventions have been established as the center of intellectual vitality in Slavic, East European, and Eurasian studies by creating the international forum wherein over 2,000 attendees (scholars, professionals, and graduate students—domestic and international) exchange new research and information face-to-face on an annual basis. The convention lasts four days and features approximately 500 panels and round-tables and 40 meetings.

The Annual Convention also provides the opportunity to recognize outstanding scholarship in the field by awarding prizes to works of merit published within the preceding year. ASEEES awards nine book prizes, a dissertation prize, and a graduate essay prize. These prizes work to motivate scholars to perform at the highest of standards, therefore strengthening the field of Slavic, East European, and Eurasian studies.

ASEEES' organizational newsletter serves as the informal medium for coverage of the news of the field and profession. Distributed to their 3,000 members five times a year, it reports the activities of members and affiliates, notes members' recent publications, provides a calendar of conferences, features articles and speeches, lists summer programs and fellowship/grant opportunities, and lists job postings from their over fifty institutional members.

About

Background and formation
In the aftermath of World War II, the face of Europe was greatly changed. A number of countries of central and eastern Europe fell under the influence or control of the Soviet Union following the defeat of Germany. Throughout the non-communist world, political decision-makers felt a need for additional academic analysis of the politics and history of the USSR and the Soviet bloc nations as well as for improved facilities for language training for a new generation of foreign affairs specialists.

A number of American universities established area studies programs and research institutes in the immediate postwar period, including notably Harvard University in Cambridge, Massachusetts, Columbia University in New York City, and the University of Washington in Seattle. These institutions successfully produced the leading scholars of Slavic studies in North America. A number of graduates and professors from these programs were instrumental in forming the American Association for the Advancement of Slavic Studies (AAASS) from its conception between the Joint Committee on Slavic Studies (JCSS) and the American Council of Learned Societies' professional journal to being its own membership organization.

The organization's precursors—the Joint Committee on Slavic Studies (JCSS) and the American Slavic and East European Review (ASEER)—were two entities already in the field. The JCSS—a joint committee of the American Council of Learned Societies (ACLS) and the Social Science Research Council (SSRC)—supported scholarly conferences and publications, disbursed research and fellowship grants, and sponsored bibliographic and other projects. In 1938, the JCSS set up a subcommittee specifically for the review of Russian studies, whose chief activity was to prompt and finalize a proposal for a national professional organization. This subcommittee joined forces with ACLS's professional journal ASEER—American Slavic and East European Review, a scholarly magazine launched in 1941 by John Hazard of Columbia University. By that point, ASEER had already created a corporation named the American Association for the Advancement of Slavic Studies, Inc. (AAASS). They did so, in 1948, so as to have an "owner" (but was merely a “legal umbrella”) so that they would be permitted to print their journal in the State of New York—that year is still considered the association's official date of establishment.

Together, ASEER and JCSS coordinated the June 1, 1960, launch of a full-fledge national professional membership organization under the existing AAASS name. This new AAASS combined the activities of both the JCSS's Russian Studies subcommittee and the ASEER. However, ASEER was soon enlarged, revised, and renamed to become AAASS' own quarterly peer-reviewed journal, Slavic Review. Professor Donald Treadgold of the University of Washington was the initial editor of this new official AAASS publication. AAASS had (and continues to have) an interdisciplinary scope, and was to be a means of promoting contact and communication and of encouraging a sense of identification and association among those concerned with Russian and East European Studies. Its main functions were to distribute an annual bibliography, to sponsor professional meetings and scholarly conferences, to provide a non-juried periodic newsletter (published to promote the flow of information among society members regarding the status of ongoing research and other matters of general academic interest), and to promote and sponsor other projects designed to help the field as a whole.

Change of name
In 2008, the Association's membership voted to change the name of the AAASS, effective in 2010, to the Association for Slavic, East European, and Eurasian Studies (ASEEES). This new name reflects the Association's widened scope to Eurasia/Central Asia. The change in name coincided with the move of the Association's headquarters from Harvard in Cambridge, Massachusetts, to the University of Pittsburgh in Pittsburgh, Pennsylvania.

Organization
ASEEES' national office is located at the University of Pittsburgh. It handles membership, publication subscriptions,  NewsNet, and organizes and coordinates programmatic activities like the annual convention.

Six regional affiliates and a geographically wide-ranging committee structure enable members across the country to effectively work together on matters of professional interest. Specifically,  regional affiliates sponsor scholarly meetings and activities within their respective regions of the US. ASEEES committees contribute to many aspects of the organization including scholarly ventures, prizes and publications. In addition, ASEEES has organizational ties with scholarly societies within the broad field of Slavic, East European, and Eurasian studies. These affiliates normally sponsor panels and hold meetings at the annual ASEEES convention.

Board of directors
The ASEEES by-laws establish that the business, property, and affairs are conducted and managed by a Board of Directors. This board currently consists of twenty-four officers—each with different term lengths. Each year, officers cycle off and the ASEEES holds elections to designate a new Vice-President/President-Elect, two members-at-large, and (every other year) a graduate student representative.

Click here for more information and a list of current officers.

Membership

Individual
ASEEES has approximately 3,000 members and subscribers in the US and abroad. Members come from the academic community, as well as from the government and private sectors. Membership is open to anyone interested in furthering the scholarly objectives of ASEEES. Members:

receive the Slavic Review and NewsNet
may participate in convention panels
receive significant discounts on subscription rates to affiliated journals
have access to job announcements, networking opportunities through its members-only website, and social networking groups

Institutional
Institutions with programs or interests in Slavic, East European, and Eurasian studies are eligible to become institutional members of ASEEES. Over fifty institutions demonstrate their support of the field via membership in the Association. Through their representatives on the Council of Institutional Members, they exchange viewpoints and work together on issues of common concern.

Publications

Slavic Review

The Slavic Review is ASEEES' chief publication and is the leading scholarly journal in the field. It features articles, discussions, and reviews of recent literature that span all academic disciplines and geographic areas within Slavic studies. The Slavic Review is available on JSTOR.

The editorial offices of the Slavic Review are located at the University of Illinois, Urbana-Champaign.

NewsNet
NewsNet is ASEEES' newsletter, which carries news both of the profession and of the association and is published five times a year. It includes:

articles on issues important to the field
news about members
individual
institutional
affiliate organizations
a calendar of conferences
notices of members' publications
job postings
summer programs
statistical data on area studies graduates

Annual conventions
The annual convention is one of ASEEES' core activities. Each year, it provides an exciting international forum aimed at continuing intellectual vitality in the field through a broad exchange of ideas. Scholars, professionals, and students alike have the chance to explore the newest research and information by participating in panel and round-table discussions from all disciplines. With an average of over 2,000 attendees each year, the convention is excellent opportunity to network with colleagues, publishers, and related organizations.

ASEEES (formerly AAASS) has held conventions since 1964. The first convention of the organization was held in New York City in April 1964, under the chairmanship of Professor Holland Hunter of Haverford College. Although the organization initially held these gatherings every third year so as not to sap the strength of the organization, they have been held on an annual basis for decades, hosted in a different city each year.

Prizes and awards 

The Association annually awards various prizes and awards which are presented at the Awards Presentation during the Annual Convention:

 Distinguished Contributions Award
 CLIR Distinguished Service Award
 Wayne S. Vucinich Book Prize
 USC Book Prize in Literary and Cultural Studies
  Book Prize in History
 Davis Center Book Prize in Political and Social Studies
 Marshall D. Shulman Book Prize
 Ed A Hewett Book Prize
 Barbara Jelavich Book Prize
 Kulczycki Book Prize in Polish Studies
 W. Bruce Lincoln Book Prize (even-numbered years only)
 Graduate Student Essay Prize
 Tucker/Cohen Dissertation Prize

Regional affiliates
Regional affiliates sponsor scholarly meetings and activities within their respective regions of the US.
Central Slavic Conference
Midwest Slavic Conference
Northeast Slavic, East European, and Eurasian Conference (formerly Mid-Atlantic Slavic Conference)
Southern Conference on Slavic Studies
Southwest Slavic Association
Western Association for Slavic Studies (formerly Rocky Mountain Association for Slavic Studies)

See also
American Association of Teachers of Slavic and Eastern European Languages
American Council of Teachers of Russian
Slavistics

References

External links
Association for Slavic, East European, and Eurasian Studies official website
Slavic Review Homepage

Organizations established in 1948
Historical societies of the United States
Professional associations based in the United States
Clubs and societies in the United States
Academic organizations based in the United States
1948 establishments in the United States
Organizations based in Pittsburgh